Guy Easterby (born 21 March 1971) is a former rugby union player for Ireland. He is currently head of rugby operations of Leinster.

His father is English and his mother is Irish. He is the brother of Simon Easterby, also an Ireland international and the most capped back-rower to come from Yorkshire.

Easterby made his senior Ireland debut against the United States on 10 June 2000 and marked the occasion by scoring two tries in a record 83–3 victory.
Easterby made his test debut in the same year as Peter Stringer but always trailed the Munster scrum-half in the Irish pecking order. 21 out of his 27 appearances before the 2005 Six Nations Championship were made as a substitute. He enjoyed a stint with London Scottish after enjoying his most successful part of his career with Rotherham in the English Premiership and with Leinster in Ireland. He retired after the 2006–07 season, though he made a comeback against Edinburgh Rugby on 15 December 2007

References 

1971 births
Living people
Blackrock College RFC players
English people of Irish descent
Irish people of English descent
English Roman Catholics
English rugby union players
Ireland international rugby union players
Irish Exiles rugby union players
Leinster Rugby non-playing staff
Leinster Rugby players
People educated at Ampleforth College
Rotherham Titans players
Rugby union players from Tadcaster
Rugby union scrum-halves
Irish rugby union players
Citizens of Ireland through descent